Joan de Sagarra i Devesa (Paris, 8 January 1938) is a Catalan journalist and writer, son of the poet Josep Maria de Sagarra.

Biography 
De Sagarra studied at the Institut d'Études Théâtrals of the Sorbonne, and when back in Barcelona he worked as a journalist for Tele/eXpres, El País and El Temps, among other publications. He still writes columns for  La Vanguardia newspaper.

He is thought to be the father of the concept of the Gauche Divine ("divine left"), a movement of leftist intellectuals and artists that spread through Barcelona in the 1960s and early 1970s. The majority of its members came from the well-to-do classes of the Catalan capital.

Bibliography 
 Las rumbas de Joan de Sagarra (Kairós, 1971)
 La horma de mi sombrero (Alfaguara, 1997)

References

External links
 Interview in the TV program (S)avis of TV3, 13 November 2013 (Catalan)
 Interview in the journal Jot Down, January 2013 (Spanish)

Catalan-language writers
Journalists from Catalonia
Writers from Catalonia
1938 births
Living people